The Small Business Party (SBP), officially registered as The Small Business Party is a political party in New South Wales in Australia. Their main focus is as an advocate for small businesses. The party was founded in 2017 by Angela Vithoulkas, a City of Sydney councillor and café-operator.

The party claims that the major parties focus too much on the larger businesses, and ignore the smaller ones, even though the vast majority are small businesses.
The party's platform mostly focuses on lowering taxes associated with business, however they also advocate for better education and out of school care for children. They also have a policy to cut immigration, as the party claims that the infrastructure in New South Wales is inadequate for sustaining immigration.

The federal party was deregistered on 23 August 2021 due to the party ceasing to have at least 500 members. As of 2023, the state party remains registered with the New South Wales Electoral Commission.

References

External links

Political parties in New South Wales
2017 establishments in Australia